S.W.A.T. is an American crime action drama television series, based on the 1975 television series of the same name created by Robert Hamner and developed by Rick Husky. The new series was developed by Aaron Rahsaan Thomas and Shawn Ryan, and premiered on CBS on November 2, 2017. The series is produced by Original Film, CBS Studios and Sony Pictures Television. In April 2021, the series was renewed for a fifth season which premiered on October 1, 2021. In April 2022, CBS renewed the series for a sixth season which premiered on October 7, 2022.

Series overview

Episodes

Season 1 (2017–18)

Season 2 (2018–19)

Season 3 (2019–20)

Season 4 (2020–21)

Season 5 (2021–22)

Season 6 (2022–23)

Home media

References

External links
 
 
 

S.W.A.T. (franchise)
Lists of action television series episodes
Lists of American crime drama television series episodes
Lists of American action television series episodes